Ballobar is a municipality in the province of Huesca, Spain. As of 2010, it has a population of 981 inhabitants.

References 

 auto

Municipalities in the Province of Huesca